= Metsäkustannus =

Finnish forestry publishing company

- Industry: Forest
- Founded: 1982
- Headquarters: Finland
- Products: Metsälehti magazine, books about forest
- Website: www.metsalehti.fi

Metsäkustannus Oy is a Finnish company that is specialized to forests. Its main product is Metsälehti magazine. Circulation was 31 701 in 2014.

Also company publishes about 35 books per year.

== History ==
Company is established 1982 but Metsälehti's historia starts from 1933 and its predecessor Tapio magazine, 1907. Company was established with the name Kustannusosakeyhtiö Metsälehti and name was changed to Metsäkustannus Oy in 2005.
